Minister of Finance and Budget of the Central African Republic is a government minister in charge of the Ministry of Finance and Budget of Central African Republic, which is responsible for public finances of the country.

Ministers responsible for finance
Abel Goumba, 1957-1958-?
Albert Payao, 1959-1961
Jean Amity, 1961
Charles Bornou, 1962-1966
Alexandre Banza, 1966-1967
Antoine Guimali, 1968-1970
François Valentin Gon, 1970-1971
Enoch Dérant Lakoué, 1971-1972
Alphonse Koyamba, 1972-1975
Marie-Christine Gbokou, 1975-1977
Hugues Dobozendi, 1977-1978
François Epaye, 1978-1979
Alphonse Koyamba, 1979-1980
Dieudonne Padoundji-Yadjoua, 1980
François Farra-Frond, 1980-1981
Barthélémy Kanda, 1981
Timothée Marboua, 1981-1982
Alphonse Kongolo-Mbomy, 1982-1983
Sylvestre Bangui, 1983-1984
Jean-Louis Gervil-Yambala, 1984-1986
Dieudonné Wazoua, ?-1987-1991
Auguste Tenekouezoa, 1991-1992
Emmanuel Dokouna, 1992-1996
Jean-Paul Ngoupande, 1996-1997
Anicet-Georges Dologuélé, 1997-2001
Eric Sorongopé, 2001-2003
Martin Ziguélé, 2003
Abel Goumba, 2003
Jean Pierre Lebouder, 2003-2004
Daniel Nditiféï Boyssembè, 2004-2005
Théodore Dabanga, 2005-2006
Sylvain Ndoutingai, 2006-2008
Élie Doté, 2006-2008
Emmanuel Bizo, 2008-2009
Albert Besse, 2009-2011
Sylvain Ndoutingai, 2011-2012
Nicolas Tiangaye, 2013-2014
Rémy Yakoro, 2014
Bonandelé Koumba, 2014-2015
Abdallah Kadre Hassan, 2015-2016
Célestin Yanendji, 2016
Henri-Marie Dondra, 2016-2021
Hervé Ndoba, 2021-

See also 
 Economy of Central African Republic

References

External links 
 Ministry website

Government of the Central African Republic
Government ministers of the Central African Republic

Economy of the Central African Republic